FilmStruck was a film streaming service from Turner Classic Movies which catered to cinephiles and focused on rare, classic, foreign, arthouse, and independent cinema. It launched in November 2016 and succeeded Hulu as the exclusive online streaming home of The Criterion Collection. It was discontinued on November 29, 2018, and was replaced by the Criterion Channel  nearly two years later.

History 
FilmStruck was launched on November 1, 2016, after being announced in April 2016. At the time of its launch, FilmStruck had 500 movies available to stream, 200 of them from the Criterion Collection library. As of February 2018, the combined channels on the service provide access to over 1,600 films, including more than 1,200 films licensed from the Criterion Collection.  On April 26, 2018, FilmStruck absorbed sister stand-alone service Warner Archive Instant, with current and new subscribers to the FilmStruck website.

On October 26, 2018, it was announced FilmStruck would shut down on November 29, 2018, due to WarnerMedia's restructuring. In response, a group of film directors and actors signed a letter dated November 12, 2018, appealing directly to Warner Bros. Pictures Group chairman Toby Emmerich in an attempt to save the service. The letter was signed by Paul Thomas Anderson, Damien Chazelle, Alfonso Cuarón, Guillermo del Toro, Leonardo DiCaprio, James Gray, Alejandro González Iñárritu, Barry Jenkins, Rian Johnson, Christopher Nolan, Barbra Streisand, and others. Previously, Steven Spielberg and Martin Scorsese had urged Warner Bros. to continue the service. Four days after the letter was released, WarnerMedia and Criterion announced that The Criterion Channel would launch as a standalone service in Spring 2019, with a smaller version of the service also being available via HBO Max, WarnerMedia's upcoming streaming platform when it launched on May 27, 2020.

Library and programming 
Films available on FilmStruck came from studios and distributors such as Film Movement, First Run Features, Global Lens, Flicker Alley, Icarus Films, Janus Films, Kino, MGM, Milestone, Oscilloscope Laboratories, Shout! Factory, and Warner Bros.

FilmStruck organized films in themed collections, while the Criterion Channel had original content such as their "Meet the Filmmaker" and "Adventures in Moviegoing" series, five-minute micro-lectures, as well as thematic programming like Friday double features and Tuesday short and feature film pairings. Some films featured hosted introductions.

In early 2018, FilmStruck announced it had acquired hundreds of classic film titles from the Warner Bros. library, including Casablanca, Citizen Kane, and Singin' in the Rain.

Reception 
The Verge praised the availability of "best films ever made", while criticizing the catalog search functionality in July 2017. Geek.com praised the delivery on home theater streaming media devices and the mobile app, but criticized the desktop delivery dependency on Flash.

International availability 
FilmStruck Curzon was announced in January 2018. The service became available in the United Kingdom in February 2018, with launches in other markets to have come over the next two years. Plans to launch in France and Spain were announced in May 2018.

In France, the SVOD service features films from Carlotta Films, MK2, RKO, and StudioCanal and was launched in June 2018. In Spain, the service serves up films from Wanda, Caramel, and A Contracorriente Films. It offers a combination of the local content as well as European and global films.

See also 
 Fandor (film site)
 MUBI
 HBO Max
 DramaFever
 DC Universe
 Hooq
 VRV
 Crunchyroll
 List of streaming media services

References

External links 

American film websites
Subscription video on demand services
Defunct subscription services
Internet properties established in 2016
Defunct video on demand services
2016 establishments in the United States
Entertainment companies established in 2016
Internet properties disestablished in 2018
2018 disestablishments in the United States
Entertainment companies disestablished in 2018
Turner Broadcasting System
The Criterion Collection